Event Two of the 2016 Monster Energy FIM Speedway World Cup was the second race of the 2016 edition of the Speedway World Cup. It was staged on July 26 at the Stena Arena in Västervik, Sweden and was won by hosts and defending champions Sweden from Australia, United States, and Germany. As a result, Sweden progressed directly to the 2016 Speedway World Cup Final, while Australia and United States progressed to the 2016 Speedway World Cup Race-off. Germany were eliminated.

Antonio Lindbäck and Andreas Jonsson led Sweden success by scoring 13 points each, with Fredrik Lindgren and Peter Ljung scored 11 each to earn Sweden 48 points. Jason Doyle top scored for Australia with 12 points, while Greg Hancock guided United States to third by scoring 17 points.

Results

Scores

References

See also 
 2016 Speedway Grand Prix

2016 Speedway World Cup